Stephania abyssinica is a species of vine native to southern Africa. it is the only member of its genus found in the region. Two subspecies are recognised.

References

abyssinica
Plants described in 1840